The Battle Hill engagement took place from 6 to 13 August 1846, during the New Zealand Wars and was one of the last engagements of the Hutt Valley Campaign.

The engagement was between Ngāti Toa on one side and a colonial force of European troops, police, and Ngāti Awa allies on the other. The colonial force commanded by Major Last was seeking to end resistance to European settlement in the Hutt Valley region. It was pursuing over 300 Ngāti Toa, including women and children, led by Te Rangihaeata.

Action
On the Government side was Ngāti Toa chief Rawiri Puaha and 100 Ngāti Toa warriors, as well as 150 Ngāti Awa "friendlies". Three government soldiers and at least nine Ngāti Toa were killed.

On 6 August, the colonial force encountered Te Rangihaeata defending a breastwork at the crest of the narrow forest ridge. Elements of the colonial force advanced to within  of the fortification, but pulled back to around  after losing three men, including acting-brigade-major Ensign Blackburn, who was killed by a Ngāti Toa fighter concealed in a tree. Last was unwilling to launch a suicidal frontal assault, terrain and vegetation prevented a flanking manoeuvre. Over the next several hours, the colonials unleashed a musket barrage of thousands of rounds, but with little effect. On 8 August, Last had two small mortars brought up to about three-quarters of a mile from the defenders. They fired around 80 shells, many landing in or near the fortification. Disinclined to attack, and vulnerable to a counter-attack, Last withdrew the regular troops on 10 August, leaving Ngāti Awa troops to launch an occasional skirmish.

On 13 August, Ngāti Awa discovered Te Rangihaeata had slipped away under cover of rain and darkness. They set off northwards in pursuit. The final skirmish occurred on the seaward side of the Pouawha Range, inland of Wainui. Ngāti Awa lost three men, in return killing four Ngāti Toa, before Te Rangihaeata made good his escape.

Legacy
The engagement pushed Te Rangihaeata out of the area and was one of the last fought between Maori and early colonial forces in the region. The site of the battle has been preserved as a recreational area named Battle Hill Farm Forest Park.

References

External links
Battle Hill Cemetery, with a photo of memorial to Roberts and Tuite

Battle Hill
1846 in New Zealand